Ompteda is a surname. Notable people with the surname include:

 Christian Friedrich Wilhelm von Ompteda (1765–1815), Hanoverian officer of the Napoleonic Wars
 Dietrich Heinrich Ludwig von Ompteda (1746–1803), Hanoverian jurist and government minister

See also